Ivan Little (born 1951) is a journalist and actor from Northern Ireland.

Journalism career
Little was born in September 1951, and began his career as a journalist working for The Portadown Times and the Belfast Telegraph. He moved into broadcasting by joining Downtown Radio. He joined Ulster Television as a reporter in 1980. In his career at UTV, he reported for Good Evening Ulster, Six Tonight and UTV Live.

Little took voluntary redundancy from the station in January 2009. At the time, he stated his intention to become a freelance journalist and to maintain an association with his employers of 29 years.

Since leaving UTV has written for Belfast Telegraph.

Co- Wrote Reporting the Troubles with long-term friend Deric Henderson.

Acting career
Little has appeared on stage in the plays The Quare Gunk, Scenes from the Big Picture, Educating Rita and Dealer's Choice. He starred in The History of the Troubles (according to my Da)'''. He appeared in a UTV documentary in 2007 discussing his involvement in the play's production.

On taking voluntary redundancy from UTV, Little stated in a newspaper interview his desire to devote more time to acting, confirming that he had two major roles in prospect.

Little has also appeared in the BBC Northern Ireland comedy Give My Head Peace from the late 1990s to mid 2000s.

Personal life
Little attended Grosvenor Grammar School, Belfast and studied journalism at the Belfast College of Commerce. He published his autobiography Little by Little'' in 2005. He has two daughters, one of them being actress Emma Little Lawless.

References

External links
 'Phenomenon' Out-take

1951 births
Journalists from Northern Ireland
Living people
Male stage actors from Northern Ireland
People educated at Grosvenor Grammar School
UTV (TV channel)